Project Mc2 (pronounced Project MC-squared) is an American streaming television series produced by DreamWorks Animation's AwesomenessTV and MGA Entertainment for Netflix. The series was first released on August 7, 2015. The last set of episodes was released on November 7, 2017.

Plot 
Set in the fictional town of Maywood Glen, California, and revolving around the fields of STEM, the series follows the adventures of McKeyla McAlister and her best friends, who work for a government organization called NOV8 (pronounced "innovate"), a highly secretive group of female government operatives who are trying to protect the world.

Cast and characters

Main 

 Mika Abdalla as McKeyla McAlister, the lead girl and an agent of NOV8. At the beginning of Part 4, she was given the name "The Owl".
 Ysa Penarejo as Camryn Coyle, the engineer with a high IQ
 Victoria Vida as Adrienne Attoms, the culinary chemist from Spain who always wears high heels
 Genneya Walton as Bryden Bandweth, the tech junkie of the group
 Antonio Marziale as Prince Xander (main: Part 1, recurring: Part 4)
 Marcus Choi (main: Part 1) and Ash Lee (recurring: Part 5) as Charles Coyle, Camryn's father
 Madeline Whitby as Jillian (Part 1)
 Bernardo De Paula as Defector (Part 1)
 Troy Fromin as George the Security Guard (Part 1)
 Oliver Vaquer as Francois (Part 1)
 Danica McKellar as the Quail (Parts 1–2, 4–6), the group's chief intelligence agent in NOV8 and McKeyla's mother
 Alyssa Lynch (main: Parts 2–4) and Maddie Phillips (recurring: Part 5) as Devon D'Marco, an aspiring artist
 Belle Shouse as Ember Evergreen (Parts 2–6)

Recurring 
 Jonathon Buckley as Henry (Part 1)
 Melissa Mabie as A.D.I.S.N. (voice), McKeyla's talking notebook. Her name is short for "Advanced Digital Intelligence Spy Notebook". It is pronounced as "Addison".
 Johanna Newmarch as Carson Lazarus (Parts 2–3)
 Ty Wood as Justin (Parts 2–3)
 Maxwell Haynes as Kyle (Parts 2–6)
 Adrian Petriw as Retro (voice; Part 2)
 Kurt Evans as Assistant Principal Wilson (Part 2)
 Vanessa Parise as the Falcon (Part 3), McKeyla's aunt Montana who is also a substitute for the Quail while she's off the grid
Sarah Desjardins as Maddy McAlister (Parts 3–4, 6), McKeyla's big sister. At the beginning of Part 4, she was given the name "The Nighthawk".
 Adam Beauchesne as Simon Temple (Part 3)
 Emily Delahunty as Tessa (Part 5)
 Houston Stevenson as Zach (Parts 5–6)
 Jody Thompson as Jenny Wallis (Part 5)
 Catherine Haggquist as Dr. A. Crawford (Part 5)
 Richard Ian Cox as Professor Kato (Part 5)
 Jay Hindle as Max McAlister (Part 6), McKeyla's father
 Chris Rosamond as Bobby Stone (Part 6)
 Loretta Walsh as Charlotte Adele (Part 6)

Episodes

Series overview

Part 1 (2015)

Part 2 (2016)

Part 3 (2016)

Part 4 (2017)

Part 5 (2017)

Part 6 (2017)

Production 
The first season of the series, consisting of three episodes, was released on August 7, 2015. On April 6, 2016, Netflix announced that the series has been renewed for its second and third seasons. The second season was released on August 12, 2016, and the third season was released on October 14, 2016. Both consisted of six episodes. An extended 34-minute Valentine's Day special was released as the first and only episode of the fourth season on February 14, 2017. A fifth season consisting of five episodes was released on September 15, 2017. A sixth season, also consisting of five episodes, was released on November 7, 2017.

The series is filmed primarily in and around the San Fernando Valley area of Los Angeles, including Chatsworth, Woodland Hills, Van Nuys, and Northridge, as well as in Alhambra.

Notes

References

External links 
 
Project Mc2 at Netflix
 

2010s American comedy television series
2010s American high school television series
2015 American television series debuts
2017 American television series endings
Espionage television series
MGA Entertainment brands
Netflix children's programming
English-language Netflix original programming
Television shows set in California
Awesomeness (company)
Fictional secret agents and spies
Science education television series